Senator Crotty may refer to:

Maggie Crotty (1948–2020), Illinois State Senate
Rich Crotty (born 1948), Florida State Senate